Hou Yaowen (July 17, 1948 – June 23, 2007), or Hou Yuewen, was a Chinese xiangsheng actor.  China's famous crosstalk performer. Manchu, originally from Beijing. At that time, he was a member of the China Federation of Literary and Art Circles, vice chairman of the Chinese Quyi Artists Association, member of the Party Committee of the China Railway Art Troupe, deputy head (deputy bureau level) and head of the rap troupe, and a national first-class actor. 

Son of crosstalk master Hou Baolin.

Biography
Hou Yaowen was born in 1948, as the third son of Hou Baolin. He became a xiangsheng actor in 1960. In 1960, 12-year-old Hou Yaowen made his debut on stage. The performance was the cross talk "Drunk" that his father Hou Baolin once performed. His mother, Wang Yalan, a native of Tianjin, is a Peking Opera performer. After liberation, she organized a Peking Opera troupe in the street, teaching opera as a compulsory obligation and training young actors. Hou Yaowen’s profound Peking Opera skills also benefited from her motherb's teaching. Hou Yaowen's two older brothers are Hou Yaozhong and Hou Yaohua. 

He was selected as one of the Chinese Top Ten Comedian Stars in 1994. His performances are vivid, humorous, distinctive and unique, and his cross talk works have a wide influence at home and abroad. His representative works include XiQuManTan, KouTuLianHua, JingJiuYanYi, etc(戏曲漫谈、口吐莲花、京九演义). He has participated in the 11th CCTV Spring Festival Gala.

In 1985, he became one of the "Top Ten comedians in China". In 1993, he was awarded the "International Art Achievement Certificate" by the American Huamei Art Society. In 1996, he was awarded the title of "Artist with Virtue and Art" by the Ministry of Culture and many other honors. 

Hou died of heart attack at his home on June 23, 2007, aged 59.

Guo Degang is Hou's disciple.

Career Experience 
In 1960, Hou Yaowen made his debut, and his performance was Drunk, which was performed by his father. Since then, because his father Hou Baolin opposed his cross talk career, Hou Yaowen took his nickname "Little Adi" as his stage name and spent the first four years on the cross talk stage.

In 1965, Hou Yaowen, who graduated from junior high school, was admitted to the China Railway Art Troupe, where he partnered with Shi Fukuan.

In 1970, he went to the 38th Army in Baoding, Hebei Province with the Art Troupe. After working, he also rehearsed with the soldiers, and created and performed more than a dozen cross talks, such as "Being Smart and Brave" and "Little Ball Pushing Big Ball".

In October, 1976, after the "Cultural Revolution", several works such as Money-obsessed husbands, being brave, and talking about drama

etc. were released one after another, and the names of Hou Yaowen and Shi Fukuan began to be known to the audience. On July 28, 1976, six days after the Tangshan earthquake, Hou Yaowen went to the disaster area with the railway rescue team for rescue and condolences.

On October 30, 1979, he was elected as a delegate and participated in the 4th Congress of China Writers and Artists. Father Hou Baolin was also a representative of the conference, so his father recognized Hou Yaowen's position in art. In the same year, he was elected as a member of all-china youth federation. In the same year, he participated in the central condolence group and went to the front line of the Sino-Vietnamese border self-defense counterattack. During this period, he created the cross talk "The Disillusionment of a Myth".

On February 12, 1983, he participated in the first CCTV Spring Festival party and performed the cross talk "Be polite".

On June 26, 1984, he participated in the "National Crosstalk Appraisal Meeting" held in Qingdao. In this appraisal, Shen Yongnian and Hou Yaowen created the crosstalk "Sweet and Sour Live Fish" performed by Hou Yaowen and Shi Fukuan, and was awarded two first prizes for creation and performance. On December 11, he visited the United States with the China Quyi Rap Group led by Hou Baolin, and made the first official performance of Quyi abroad, which was performed in five cities: new york, Washington, Los Angeles, San Francisco and Seattle. On December 29, he flew to Hong Kong and gave eight performances in Hong Kong. In the same year, Hou Yaowen won the highest prize in the National Crosstalk Competition-the first "Hou Baolin Academy Award".

In 1985, in order to celebrate the 20th anniversary of the establishment of Tibet Autonomous Region, he climbed the Tanggula Mountain at an altitude of more than 5,000 meters with the central condolence group and performed for the railway surveyors.

On February 16, 1988, CCTV Spring Festival Gala was broadcast as the host. On February 5, 1989, he participated in the recording of CCTV Spring Festival Gala and performed the sketch "A Day of Hero Mother" in cooperation with Zhao Lirong.

In 1993, he was awarded the "International Certificate of Artistic Achievement" by the American Huamei Art Society.

In September 2000, he joined the Communist Party of China (CPC). On September 19, 2001, terrorists created the September 11 incident in the United States. In a special period, he went to the United States with the China Federation of Returned Overseas Chinese Art Troupe to express condolences to overseas Chinese, and held charity performances in nine regions including Phoenix, Boston and Dallas.

On November 5, 2002, he went to Tianjin to participate in the "Academic Seminar to Commemorate the 104th Birthday of Zhang Shouchen" and performed the cross talk "Eight Fan Screens". On December 10, he became the vice chairman of Chinese Quyi Artists Association. In the same year, he served as the deputy head of China Railway Art Troupe, the head of art direction and rap troupe. In the same year, he served as the judge of CCTV National TV Crosstalk Competition.

On September 11, 2003, the "Global Conference of Overseas Chinese Promoting the Peaceful Reunification of China" was held in Moscow, and Hou Yaowen attended the Mid-Autumn Festival party for the delegates.

On the evening of September 23rd, 2006, the 4th China Quyi Peony Awards Gala was held in Wutaishan Gymnasium, Nanjing, as the awarding guest.

On February 13, 2007, "2007 China Xiaoxing (Jinan) Crosstalk Joy Club" was staged in Jinan. The China Railway Art Troupe, led by Hou Yaowen, performed with Degang Guo, Yu Qian, Shi Fukuan, Yang Jinming, Shi Shengjie, Li Jiacun, Qizhi and Chen Hanbai. On the afternoon of June 21st, he participated in the recording of the final scene of "the legendary swordsman" in Tianjin. The program scheduled to be broadcast in early July became Mr. Hou's final performance on the TV screen.

Personal life

Family Situation 
Hou Yaowen is the third son of the late crosstalk performer Hou Baolin.

Mother: Wang Yalan. A native of Tianjin, and is a Peking Opera actor. After liberation, she organized a Peking Opera Troupe in the street to teach opera and train young actors. Hou Yaowen's profound knowledge of Peking Opera also benefited from her mother's teaching.

Hou Yaowen's second brother is crosstalk performer Hou Yaohua.

Marriage Experience 
The first marriage: In 1990, Hou Yaowen ended his marriage with Leo Liu, a dancer of the Railway Art Troupe, and his eldest daughter Hou Zan.

The second marriage: In 1993, Hou Yaowen married Yuan Yin, a brilliant student of Beijing Film Academy, and divorced in 2004. Give birth to a little daughter Hou Yishan (nicknamed Niu Niu, only 7 years old in 2004).

The third marriage: Hou Yaowen's cohabiting girlfriend is a dancer and director of the Railway Art Troupe.

Apprentices 
There are 28 disciples in Hou Yaowen, namely: Li Bocheng, Li Boliang, Zhao Guangwu, Jia Lun, Gao Yuqing, Li Bingjie, Dan Lianli, Chen Hanbai, Guo Qiulin, Liu Ji, Li Fusheng, Wang Wei, Ma Xiaoping, Wang Zhaolin, Yang Guang, Qi Zhi, Jiang Guicheng, Wang Yu, Liu Jie, Guo Xiaoxiao, Jing Linye, Guo Degang and Chang Kuan.

One of the most famous is Guo Degang:

Guo Degang joined the art world in 1979. He first studied storytelling with Gao Qinghai, a storytelling elder, and then studied crosstalk with Chang Baofeng, a famous crosstalk artist. In 2004, he also studied Peking Opera, Pingju, Hebei Bangzi and other operas. Beijing Deyunshe was founded in 1996, formally Beijing Deyunshe Culture Communication Company Ltd., is a Chinese xiangsheng organization and folk art performance group based in Beijing. Since 2005, Guo DeGang and its Deyunshe have sprung up, which made the public pay attention to the art category of cross talk again and realized the second revival of cross talk.

After Hou Yaowen passed away suddenly, the reporter contacted Guo Degang and Qizhi, Hou Yaowen's disciples, who were deeply saddened by the death of their mentor. When the reporter called on the evening of June 23, Guo Degang was live broadcasting a TV program in Hefei. After hearing the news, Guo Degang and Yu Qian, who were preparing to record, burst into tears. Originally planned to return to Beijing immediately, and even checked off the playing list, but in the end Guo Degang and Yu Qian held back their grief and continued to record. 

After the thirteenth anniversary of Hou Yaowen's death, Guo Degang still wrote poems and published articles to mourn his master.

Partner 
Shi FuKuan---Hou Yaowen and Shi Fukuan began to partner in 1965 until Hou Yaowen died.

Death Information 
Hou died of heart attack at his home on June 23, 2007, aged 59. According to Guo Suqing, the deputy director of the emergency center, the emergency center received a call from Hou Yaowen's family at about 6:30 pm on June 23. When the emergency personnel arrived at the scene, Hou Yaowen had no signs of life, his pupils dilated, and his breathing stopped. After being sent to the Third Hospital of Peking University, after 40 minutes of rescue by doctors, he finally died.

Regarding the cause of Hou Yaowen's sudden death, Dean Guo said that it should be a cardiac disease. Hou Yaowen had no history of cardiovascular and cerebrovascular diseases before his death, but because it is now summer, the hot weather can easily lead to sudden cardiovascular and cerebrovascular diseases. Dean Guo expressed regret for Hou Yaowen's death.

Burial 
Crosstalk actor Hou Yaowen died of illness in June 2007, and it was nearly four years until March 2011. Although the he has passed away, the things behind him have not been settled, and the contradiction between family members due to the division of inheritance has led to Hou Yaowen's delay in being buried.

Until March 23, 2011, Hou Yaowen, who had died for nearly four years, was finally buried.

Representative Works 

Other works:

 《财迷丈人》
 《火红的心》
 《乾隆再世》
 《一部电视剧的诞生》
 《侯大明白》
 《戏曲漫谈》
 《见义勇为》
 《京九演义》
 《侯氏发声法》
 《你怎么不早说》
 《小眼看世界》
 《拿人手短》
 《心累》
 《打岔》
 《英雄母亲的一天》
 《打扑克》

References

External links
 Biography of Hou Haowen, sina.com, June 23, 2007.

1948 births
2007 deaths
Male actors from Beijing
Chinese xiangsheng performers
Chinese male stage actors
20th-century comedians
Manchu male actors